Tarsosteninae is a subfamily of checkered beetles in the family Cleridae. There are at least two genera and two described species in Tarsosteninae.

Genera
These two genera belong to the subfamily Tarsosteninae:
 Paratillus Gorham, 1876
 Tarsostenus Spinola, 1844

References

Further reading

External links

 

Cleridae
Articles created by Qbugbot